Dhivehi Premier League is a Maldivian men's professional football league. At the top of the Maldives football league system, it is the country's primary football competition. Contested by 10 clubs, it operates on a system of promotion and relegation with Second Division Football Tournament.

Teams are playing 14 matches each (playing each team in the league twice) totalling 56 matches in the season. The competition formed as the Dhivehi Premier League succeeded the Dhivehi League. From 2018 onward 10 teams compete in Dhivehi Premier League.

History

Competition format

Competition 
There are 10 clubs in the Premier League. During the course of a season each club plays the others twice (a double round-robin system), for a total of 14 games. Teams receive three points for a win and one point for a draw. No points are awarded for a loss. Teams are ranked by total points, then goal difference, and then goals scored. If still equal, teams are deemed to occupy the same position. If there is a tie for the championship, for relegation, or for qualification to other competitions, a play-off match decides rank.

Qualification for Asian competitions 
The top two teams in the Dhivehi Premier League qualify for the AFC Cup, with the champion directly entering the group stage. The second-placed team enters the AFC Cup at the play-off round for East Asia Zone and must win the match in order to enter the group stage.

Sponsorship

Finances 
The Football Association of Maldives (FAM) provides each Premier League team with an amount of MVR 1.6 million. The Champion team also receives a MVR 1 million cash prize.

2021–22 Dhivehi Premier League teams

All-time Dhivehi Premier League table
The all-time Dhivehi Premier League table is a cumulative record of all match results, points and goals of every team that has played in the Premier League since its inception in 2015. The table that follows is accurate as of the end of the 2021–22 season. Teams in bold are part of the 2022–23 Premier League.

Notes

Managers

References

External links 
 Ooredoo Dhivehi Premier League (2016 MD3-2017) at Mihaaru 

 
Maldives
2014 establishments in the Maldives
Sports leagues established in 2014
1